Emeryrhynchium is a monotypical afrotropical genus of potter wasps known from Equatorial Africa (Democratic Republic of Congo, Equatorial Guinea and Sierra Leone). Its only known species is Emeryrhynchium emeryanus (Gribodo 1892).

References

 Carpenter, J.M., J. Gusenleitner & M. Madl. 2010a. A Catalogue of the Eumeninae (Hymenoptera: Vespidae) of the Ethiopian Region excluding Malagasy Subregion. Part II: Genera Delta de Saussure 1885 to Zethus Fabricius 1804 and species incertae sedis. Linzer Biologischer Beitrage 42 (1): 95-315.

Biological pest control wasps
Potter wasps
Monotypic Hymenoptera genera